Jackie Chan Action Movie Awards are awards presented to action film genre. The "Jackie Chan Action Movie Week" was originally presented  during the Shanghai International Film Festival since 2015, but in 2019 it moved to a new date and venue in Shanghai to become its own event. Voted by the reporters in the entertainment industry, the awards are aimed at "celebrating international action movies and honoring those who have made outstanding contributions to the genre". The award ceremony is named after Hong Kong action star Jackie Chan.

Held in a full-sized sports arena, notable attendees at the inaugural solo event in 2019 included Chris Tucker, Adrien Brody and Paul Haggis. Variety declared that the "scale (of the stunt-filled closing ceremony) suggested ambitions of matching an Olympic Games or World Cup ceremony."

In 2021, instead of the regular awards, the best ten Chinese action movies were selected.

Awards

Best Action Movie

Best Action Movie Director

Best Action Choreographer

Best Action Movie Actor

Best Action Movie Actress

Best New Action Performer

Best Special Effects

Best Fight

Best Action Stuntman

Best Action Stuntwoman

Lifetime Achievement

Best Screenplay

Best Art Design

Best Photography

Best Edition

Special Mention

2021: Best Chinese action movies 
Sources:

Winners 
Once upon a time in China 2 (1992)

Shaolin temple (1982)

The final master (2015)

Tiger & Dragon (2000)

A touch of Zen (1970)

New Dragon Gate Inn (1992)

The grandmaster (2013)

Hero (2002)

A better tomorrow (1986)

Wolf Warrior 2 (2017)

Honorable mentions 
Drunken master (1978)

Police story (1985)

The battle at lake Changjin (2021)

The way of the dragon (1972)

References

Chinese film awards
Shanghai International Film Festival
Jackie Chan